Helen Litton is an Irish historian and author. Her research has focused on the political history of Ireland, the Great Irish Famine, and the Easter Rising.

She has a particular focus on the lives of the Daly family from Limerick, publishing biographies of Edward Daly and Thomas Clarke . She is the editor of Revolutionary Woman, the autobiography of Kathleen Clarke. She has been on Raidió Teilifís Éireann several times for her work relating to the Easter Rising. In 2016, she was the chair of the Tom Clarke Memorial Committee.

Books 

 Thomas Clarke: 16Lives (Dublin: O'Brien Press, 2014), ISBN 9781847172617
 Edward Daly: 16Lives (Dublin: O'Brien Press, 2013), ISBN 9781847172723
 The World War II Years: The Irish Emergency: An Illustrated History (Wolfhound Press, 2001), ISBN 0863278590
 Oliver Cromwell: An Illustrated History (Wolfhound Press, 2000), ISBN 0863277454
 The Celts: An Illustrated History (Irish Amer Book Company, 1997), ISBN 086327577X
 Irish Rebellions, 1798-1921 (Dublin: O'Brien Press, 1997), ISBN 9781788490344
 The Irish civil war: An illustrated history (Wolfhound Press, 1995), ISBN 0863274803
 The Irish Famine: an illustrated history, (Wolfhound Press, 1994), ISBN 0937702145
 Revolutionary Woman Kathleen Clarke: 1878–1972; an autobiography (Dublin: O'Brien Press, 1991), ISBN 9781847170590

References 

People from Dublin (city)
21st-century Irish historians
Irish women non-fiction writers
Living people
Year of birth missing (living people)